Salvatore Joseph "Sal" Cassano (born 22 January 1945) served as the 32nd New York City Fire Commissioner from 2010 to 2014.

NYC Fire Commissioner
His appointment as New York City Fire Commissioner by New York City Mayor Michael R. Bloomberg to succeed Nicholas Scoppetta was announced on 21 December 2009, and became effective on 1 January 2010. Cassano was sworn in on 11 January 2010. On May 9, 2014, Daniel A. Nigro was announced as Cassano's successor as commissioner of the FDNY, effective June 9, 2014.

Background
A son of Italian-American immigrants, Cassano was born in the Carroll Gardens section of Brooklyn, New York, and lives on Staten Island. After serving in the United States Army during the Vietnam War, he began a career as a firefighter in November 1969. He earned an associate degree in fire protection technology from New York City College of Technology in 1970, and a Bachelor of Science degree in fire science from John Jay College of Criminal Justice in 1976.

Career
Cassano served in Manhattan and Brooklyn, and was honored five times during his career for bravery. He received commendations for meritorious acts between 1979 and 1983 for rescuing five people from burning apartments, all in Brooklyn.

Cassano held every rank in the department during his career (beginning as a firefighter in 1969), including promotions to Lieutenant in August 1977, Captain in April 1984, Battalion Chief in August 1987, Deputy Chief in June 1993, Deputy Assistant Chief in November 1999, and Assistant Chief in April 2001. He was also instrumental in rebuilding the department after 343 firefighters died as a result of the September 11 attacks, after which he was named Chief of Operations and served at this post, succeeding Daniel A. Nigro until 2006. He was appointed Chief of Department, the highest uniformed position in the department, succeeding Peter E. Hayden in 2006, and his appointment as Fire Commissioner was announced by New York City Mayor Michael Bloomberg on December 21, 2009. In 2011, in recognition of his service to the city of New York, he received the Ellis Island Medal of Honor. He was retained by new Mayor Bill De Blasio on what he emphasized was on an interim basis.

Personal
Cassano and his wife, Theresa (née Wallace),  live in the Huguenot section of Staten Island, where they raised their family. They have five children and eight grandchildren. A marathon runner, he has run the New York City Marathon four times and has broken the three-hour mark. Cassano practices the Transcendental Meditation technique and recommends it as a stress management tool for first responders and firefighters who deal with crisis and trauma, "going from 0-100 every single day."

References

Further reading
 Biography - New York City Fire Department

1945 births
Living people
United States Army personnel of the Vietnam War
Commissioners of the New York City Fire Department
American people of Italian descent
John Jay College of Criminal Justice alumni
New York City firefighters
People from Carroll Gardens, Brooklyn
People from Staten Island
Military personnel from New York City
United States Army soldiers